In molecular biology, glycoside hydrolase family 39 is a family of glycoside hydrolases.

Glycoside hydrolases  are a widespread group of enzymes that hydrolyse the glycosidic bond between two or more carbohydrates, or between a carbohydrate and a non-carbohydrate moiety. A classification system for glycoside hydrolases, based on sequence similarity, has led to the definition of >100 different families. This classification is available on the CAZy web site, and also discussed at CAZypedia, an online encyclopedia of carbohydrate active enzymes.

Glycoside hydrolase family 39 CAZY GH_39 comprises enzymes with several known activities; alpha-L-iduronidase; beta-xylosidase.

The most highly conserved regions in these enzymes are located in their N-terminal sections. These contain a glutamic acid residue which, on the basis of similarities with other families of glycosyl hydrolases, probably acts as the proton donor in their catalytic mechanism.

References 

EC 3.2.1
GH family
Protein families